The Yashkun People or Yashkuns (Shina: یشکن) are a sub-group of the Shina, a Dardic-speaking ethnic group, most of whom reside in the Gilgit division of Gilgit-Baltistan and Chitral and Kohistan districts of Khyber-Pakhtunkhwa, Pakistan. They speak a Dardic language called Shina and are scattered throughout northern Pakistan. Most researchers assert that the Yashkun were immigrants to northern Pakistan from Central Asia. However, other authorities maintain that the Yashkuns were indigenous to northern Pakistan.

History
According to historical sources, the Yashkuns migrated from the Central Asian region close to Xinjiang to present day Gilgit-Baltistan region of Pakistan.

The Yashkuns descend from the ancient tribe of Aśvakan/Aśvakas (Kambojas). They are native to the Hindu Kush region where the Kambojas once ruled. As Dardic Shina they are related to other indigenous groups such as the Pashai and Nuristânis (Kafiristanis).

The Yashkun share etymological connections with the Askunu of Nuristan and the Asawan caste found in Indian kamboj.

Demography
The Yashkuns form the majority of the population in Gor, Chilas, Tangir, Darel valley, the Indus Valley below Sazin, the upper Gilgit Valley, Gupis, Pingal Yasin (Qurqulti), Punial, Astore Valley, Chitral, Nagar, Hunza, Kohistan, Hodur, Khinar, Astore, Gurez, Dras, Talil and Soro.

References

Dardic peoples
Social groups of Gilgit Baltistan
Social groups of Pakistan